Leopoldo Tahier (born 17 June 1911, date of death unknown) was an Argentine freestyle swimmer. He competed in two events at the 1932 Summer Olympics.

References

External links
 

1911 births
Year of death missing
Argentine male freestyle swimmers
Olympic swimmers of Argentina
Swimmers at the 1932 Summer Olympics
Swimmers from Buenos Aires